Aleksandr Vladimirovich Korneev (born 11 September 1980) is a volleyball player from Russia.

He was born in Moscow.

He competed at the 2008 Summer Olympics, where Russia claimed the bronze medal.

References

External links
 
 
 

1980 births
Living people
Russian men's volleyball players
Volleyball players at the 2008 Summer Olympics
Olympic volleyball players of Russia
Olympic bronze medalists for Russia
Olympic medalists in volleyball
Medalists at the 2008 Summer Olympics
Sportspeople from Moscow
VC Belogorie players
Ural Ufa volleyball players
20th-century Russian people
21st-century Russian people